Krzysztof Kwiatkowski (born 14 May 1971, in Zgierz) is a Polish lawyer, politician and government official who served as the Minister of Justice of Poland in Cabinet of Donald Tusk from 2009 until 2011, Public Prosecutor General from 2009 until 2010, and as President of the Supreme Audit Office (NIK) from 2013 until 2019. He was also a member of Senate (from Civic Platform) from 2007 until 2011.

Krzysztof Kwiatkowski at the age of 17 joined the Federation of Fighting Youth. He began his studies at the Faculty of Law and Administration at the University of Łódź. His education was interrupted due to cancer. Kwiatkowski graduated with the Master of Law and Administration degree at Warsaw University. He had been actively participating at Independent Students’ Association as a member of the national board.

From 1997 until 2001 he held the position of the personal secretary of the Prime Minister of Poland, Jerzy Buzek. From 2004 until 2013 he was a member of Civic Platform. Kwiatkowski was also a national board member of Polish Paralympic Committee.

On 14 October 2009 he had been appointed by the president Lech Kaczyński for the position of the Minister of Justice and the Public Prosecutor General in the first Cabinet of Donald Tusk. On 11 April 2011 he became a member of Parliamentary Committee for the investigation of the Tu-154M crash in Smolensk after the Smolensk air disaster which occurred on 10 April 2010.

During parliamentary elections in 2011 Kwiatkowski was a candidate of Civic Platform to Sejm. He gained the mandate after reaching 68 814 votes.

On 26 July 2013 he was appointed by Sejm for the position of the President of the Supreme Audit Office. In the same month he resigned from his membership in Civic Platform. On 19 August 2019 he handed his resignation from the position due to the participation in parliamentary elections in the same year. Officially, his term of office ended on 30 August 2019.

External links 
 Personal page 
 Parliamentary page 

Living people
1971 births
Civic Platform politicians
Polish senators
21st-century Polish lawyers
Justice ministers of Poland
People from Zgierz
Recipients of the Order of Merit of the Republic of Hungary
University of Łódź alumni
Members of the Senate of Poland 2019–2023